Reightown is an unincorporated community and census-designated place (CDP) in Blair County, Pennsylvania, United States. It was first listed as a CDP prior to the 2020 census.

The CDP is in northern Blair County, in the central part of Antis Township. Reightown sits in the valley of Bells Gap Run, which rises on the Allegheny Front and flows southeast to the Little Juniata River at Bellwood.

References 

Census-designated places in Blair County, Pennsylvania
Census-designated places in Pennsylvania